BreadTalk Group Private Limited is a Singaporean multinational snack and beverage corporation headquartered in Paya Lebar, Singapore.

History
BreadTalk Group Pte Ltd was founded as a bakery brand in Singapore and opened it first outlet at Bugis Junction in July 2000. It was listed on the Singapore Exchange in 2003. It has since expanded to more than 900 retail stores spread across 15 markets. Its brand portfolio consists of BreadTalk, Toast Box, Food Republic, Food Junction, Bread Society, Thye Moh Chan, The Icing Room, Sō Ramen, Butter Bean and Charlie Tea in Singapore. Din Tai Fung, Song Fa Bak Kut Teh and Wu Pao Chun are franchised brands.

The Group has a network of owned bakery outlets in Singapore, PRC, Malaysia, Hong Kong and Thailand as well as franchised bakery outlets across Asia, Europe and the Middle East. It also owns and operates the Din Tai Fung restaurants in Singapore, Thailand and the United Kingdom, as well as the Food Republic food atria in Singapore, China, Taiwan, Hong Kong and Malaysia. In December 2018, the Group opened its first Din Tai Fung restaurant in London.

On 20 February 2019, BreadTalk Group bought out its Thai joint venture partner's 50% stake, The Minor Food Group, for S$6.96 million.

BreadTalk Group announced on 2 September 2019 that it planned to buy Food Junction, a food court operator similar to Food Republic (a BreadTalk brand), for $80 million. The Competition and Consumer Commission of Singapore allowed the acquisition on 15 October 2019 as the acquisition would not substantially reduce competition, and would also allow BreadTalk to better compete with other food operators.

On 5 June 2020, the company delisted from the Singapore Exchange.

Milestones
BreadTalk Group Pte Ltd's milestones are:

 Established PRC headquarters and opened its first outlet in Shanghai in 2003.
 Brought in Din Tai Fung in 2004.
 Launched Food Republic (now under name Food Opera) at Wisma Atria in 2005.
 Opened 100th international BreadTalk store in Shanghai in 2007.
 Launched 1st Food Republic in Kuala Lumpur, Malaysia in 2007.
 Opened inaugural BreadTalk stores in Oman in 2008.
 Launched 1st Bread Society outlet, an artisanal bakery in ION Orchard in 2009.
 Ground Breaking ceremony for the IHQ Building in 2011.
 Global launch of concept BreadTalk outlet in Shanghai in 2012.
 Launched a new global concept BreadTalk outlet in VivoCity in 2015.
 BreadTalk Group inked joint venture to enter the United Kingdom with Din Tai Fung restaurants in 2016.
 BreadTalk inked an agreement to enter Myanmar market in 2016.
 Food Republic, Toast Box and BreadTalk opened outlets iAT Shanghai Disneyland in 2016.
 BreadTalk Group inked a joint venture with Song Fa Bak Kut Teh to expand into new markets such as China and Thailand. Its first outlet opened in July 2018 in Shanghai.
 BreadTalk opens the first Myanmar outlet at Junction City Mall in Yangon on 10 May 2017.
 Toast Box opens the first outlet at Terminal 3 of Soekarno-Hatta International Airport, Jakarta in May 2017.
 BreadTalk Group enters a joint venture with Wu Pao Chun Bakery for expansion into four major cities in China.
 BreadTalk Group partners with Shenzhen Pindao to bring popular tea beverage brands Nayuki and Tai Gai to Singapore and Thailand.
 BreadTalk partners with Som Datt Group for expansion into India on 18 January 2018.
 Food Republic opens its first Direct Operated Restaurant ‘Sergeant Kitchen’ in Bangkok in March 2018.
 BreadTalk returns to India on 17 October 2018.
 BreadTalk Group opens the first Wu Pao Chun store in South East Asia in May 2019.
 BreadTalk Group opens its first Butter Bean outlet at Funan mall on 28 August 2020.
BreadTalk Group opens its first Charlie Tea outlet at Takashimaya Shopping Centre, Ngee Ann City in September 2020.
BreadTalk Group strikes deal with First Street Teochew Fish Soup and has opened the first new outlet under the partnership in BreadTalk IHQ on 11 November 2020.

Awards 

 SPBA Most Promising Brand Award 2002
 Singapore Prestigious Brand Award Distinctive Brand Award (Distinctive Brand Award) 2002
 Design for Asia Award, Hong Kong Design Centre 2004
 Citi Business Regional Brand Award 2005
 Five Star Diamond Brand, World Brand Laboratory in Shanghai, PRC
 Growth Market Retailer of the year, World Retail Awards 2014
 World Branding Awards 2017

Other Brands

Food Republic

BreadTalk Group's Food Republic foodcourts in Singapore are situated in shopping malls such as Wisma Atria, Vivocity and Suntec City. Overseas, there are food courts in Hong Kong (also in Silvercord of Canton Road, Tsim Sha Tsui), the People's Republic of China, Malaysia, Taiwan and Thailand.

Food Junction
BreadTalk Group acquired Food Junction in 2019.

Toast Box

BreadTalk Group operates the Toast Box concept, serving mainly coffee and kaya toast among other more modern snacks. These Toast Box outlets are typically attached to the main BreadTalk outlet or in a Food Republic food court. There have been stand-alone stores in recent years.

Din Tai Fung

BreadTalk Group is the franchisee of Taiwanese Xiao Long Bao restaurant, Din Tai Fung. It opened its first restaurant in the upscale Paragon shopping mall and has opened other outlets in the island, including one in Bishan and another in the basement annex of Raffles City. Din Tai Fung has 8 branches in Thailand. It was announced that BreadTalk Group has also been awarded the franchise to operate Din Tai Fung in the United Kingdom. This was the result of successful partnerships and the positive reputation that BreadTalk Group has had in managing the franchise in Singapore and Thailand.

The Icing Room
The Icing Room is the first-ever "Design-It-Yourself" cakes and pastry shop.

Thye Moh Chan
This 70-year old Teochew bakery was acquired in 2013.

Wu Pao Chun
BreadTalk Group opened the first Wu Pao Chun store in South East Asia in May 2019.

Bread Society
Bread Society embraces traditional artisanal baking techniques using highly nutritious ingredients.

Sanpoutei
BreadTalk Group continued to partner with the Sanpou Group to expand its variety of ramen shops in Singapore. Since 2014, Sanpoutei, which specialises in Niigata-style shoyu ramen has been operating in Holland Village. Another outlet in Shaw Centre was subsequently added, in line with the successful product reception in Singapore.

Sō Ramen
Sō Ramen is a ramen restaurant. It also offers Koshihikari rice grown from Niigata.

Butter Bean 
Butter Bean is a home-grown brand by BreadTalk Group operating as a hip café concept. It offers contemporary twists to traditional Singaporean dishes.

Charlie Tea 
Charlie Tea is a home-grown brand by BreadTalk Group specialising in a variety of tea beverages, including bubble tea, and baked goods.

Controversies
On 25 March 2015, BreadTalk pulled buns commemorating Lee Kuan Yew off shelves after receiving flak from the public. Although the proceeds from sale of the buns were meant for charitable purposes, poor communication of intentions led to the misunderstanding. BreadTalk apologised publicly on its Facebook page.

On 4 August 2015, BreadTalk stopped selling soya milk previously labelled "freshly prepared" as  they confirmed (after being confronted with photographic evidence) that the product was repackaged Yeo's soya milk packet drink. Prior to investigations, the company had initially denied that they were misleading customers. After the details had gone viral online, Breadtalk eventually apologised for its actions. On 6 August 2015, the Consumers Association of Singapore warned Breadtalk they would pursue action if the practice continued.

BreadTalk's China franchise was also accused of selling food with expired ingredients, although such a claim has yet to be proven. Seemingly contaminated wheatmeal and butter two years past its expiry date were among discoveries claimed by an undercover reporter at Hangzhou Guangqi Trade Co, in the eastern city of Hangzhou.

On 10 June 2019, the Public Utilities Board (PUB) disclosed that BreadTalk was fined S$16,300 for repeated offences of illegal waste discharge into sewers, making it among 38 companies fined for similar offences. Prior to this, BreadTalk was charged with a fine of S$19,000 for six other incidents of illegal waste discharge.

See also
 List of food companies

References

Bakeries of Singapore
Companies of Singapore
Restaurant chains in Singapore
Singaporean companies established in 2000
2000 establishments in Singapore
Specialty food shops in Singapore
Food and drink companies established in 2000
Food and drink companies of Singapore
Multinational companies headquartered in Singapore
Singaporean brands
Companies formerly listed on the Singapore Exchange